Fort Livingstone was founded as an outpost in North-West Territories, Canada.
The outpost briefly served as the capital city for the North-West Territories government for the years of 1874 to 1876 until it moved to Battleford, and headquarters for the North-West Mounted Police for the same period, until they moved their headquarters to Fort Macleod.

The site was designated a National Historic Site of Canada in 1923.  It was also designated a provincial Protected Area in 1986.

The nearest inhabited site is Pelly, Saskatchewan.

See also 
History of Northwest Territories capital cities
List of protected areas of Saskatchewan

External links
Seats of Government of the Northwest Territories
Fort Livingstone historical site

References

Military history of the Northwest Territories
Military history of Saskatchewan
Livingstone
Livingston No. 331, Saskatchewan
National Historic Sites in Saskatchewan
Parks in Saskatchewan
Forts or trading posts on the National Historic Sites of Canada register
Canadian Register of Historic Places in Saskatchewan
Division No. 9, Saskatchewan